Seyl Cheshmeh-ye Olya (also Romanized as Seyl Cheshmeh-ye ‘Olyā; also known as Seyl Cheshmeh) is a village in Kakavand-e Sharqi Rural District, Kakavand District, Delfan County, Lorestan Province, Iran. At the 2006 census, its population was 63, in 14 families.

References 

Towns and villages in Delfan County